The sugar side letter was added to the North American Free Trade Agreement (NAFTA) in last minute negotiations between the Clinton Administration and the Mexican Government before the Congress approved the North American Free Trade Agreement Implementation Act (P.L. 103-182). It altered NAFTA's initial sugar provisions by adding one additional factor to the formula to be used to determine how much sugar Mexico could export to the United States through 2008. The side letter changed this definition to add Mexican consumption of high-fructose corn syrup (HFCS) to the "net production surplus" definition. This change effectively lowers the amount of sugar that Mexico can sell to the U.S. market.

References 

History of sugar